Lake Ōnoke is a lake located in South Wairarapa District, in the Wellington Region.

Geography

The lake is mainly fed by the Ruamahanga River, but the Turanganui River and some streams also play their part.

The lake becomes noticeably shallower over the years. It was shown by studies from 1994 and 2010, in which it was found that the silting up with sediments amounts to an average of 12.5 mm per year.

References

Onoke
South Wairarapa District